Franck Claver Gnahoui David (born 1 March 1988) is a Beninese former footballer who played as a striker.

Career

In 2011, Gnahoui signed for Czech third tier side Brozany after trialing for Žižkov in the Czech top flight and Czech second tier club Ústí .

References

External links

 

1988 births
Association football forwards
Benin international footballers
Beninese expatriate footballers
Beninese expatriate sportspeople in the Czech Republic
Beninese footballers
Expatriate footballers in the Czech Republic
Living people